Andreas Bergmann (born 18 June 1959) is a German football coach and former player.

Playing career
Bergmann was born in Steinfeld A midfielder, he played for 1. FC Köln II, Wuppertaler SV, Bonner SC and VfB 06/08 Remscheid.

Coaching career
Bergmann managed Falke Steinfeld from July 1989 to June 1994.

Bergmann was head coach of the reserve team of FC St. Pauli from July 2001 to March 2004 before becoming head coach of the senior squad from March 2004 to November 2006.

As with St. Pauli, Bergmann became head coach of the reserve team of Hannover 96 prior to taking the reins of the senior squad. Bergmann was head coach of the reserve team between July 2007 and August 2009. Bergmann was named interim head coach of the senior squad in August 2009 and was given a contract until the end of the season. However, he was sacked in January 2010 and was replaced by Mirko Slomka.

Following his position at Hannover, he joined VfL Bochum. His tenure was from September 2011 to October 2012. Bergmann had been head coach of Hansa Rostock since May 2013 until his sacking in April 2014.

Coaching record

References

Living people
1959 births
German footballers
Association football midfielders
1. FC Köln II players
Wuppertaler SV players
Bonner SC players
VfB Remscheid players
German football managers
FC St. Pauli managers
Hannover 96 managers
VfL Bochum managers
Bundesliga managers
2. Bundesliga managers
FC Hansa Rostock managers
3. Liga managers